Ambérieu station or Ambérieu-en-Bugey station (French: Gare d'Ambérieu or Gare d'Ambérieu-en-Bugey) is a railway station serving the town Ambérieu-en-Bugey, Ain department, eastern France. It is situated on the Lyon–Geneva railway, Mâcon-Ambérieu railway  and Ambérieu-Montalieu-Vercieu railway. The train services are operated by SNCF.

Train services

The station is served by regional trains towards Lyon, Bourg-en-Bresse, Geneva, Annecy and Chambéry.

Regional service (TER Auvergne-Rhône-Alpes) Lyon - Ambérieu - Bellegarde - Genéve
Regional service (TER Auvergne-Rhône-Alpes) Lyon - Ambérieu - Bellegarde - Annemasse - St Gervais-les-Bains
Regional service (TER Auvergne-Rhône-Alpes) Lyon - Ambérieu - Bellegarde - Annemasse - Evian-les-Bains
Regional service (TER Auvergne-Rhône-Alpes) Lyon - Ambérieu - Aix-les-Bains - Annecy
Local service (TER Auvergne-Rhône-Alpes) Ambérieu - Bourg-en-Bresse - Mâcon
Local service (TER Auvergne-Rhône-Alpes) (Lyon -) Ambérieu - Aix-les-Bains - Chambéry

See also 

 List of SNCF stations in Auvergne-Rhône-Alpes

References

External links

Railway stations in Ain
Railway stations in France opened in 1856

Lyon–Geneva railway